Göransson Arena is an indoor arena in Sandviken, Sweden. It opened in 2009 and holds up to 10,000 people at music events and 4,000 spectators for bandy.

History
The building of the arena was financed by the Göransson Foundations, established by Göran Fredrik Göransson who founded the Sandvik corporation. It was then sold to Sandviken Municipality for a symbolic sum of 1 SEK.

It is the home arena for the bandy team Sandvikens AIK and the Bandy World Cup has been played there since 2009. The A Division of the 2017 Bandy World Championship was also played in the arena.

The second Semi-Final of Melodifestivalen 2010 took place there.

International, multi-platinum pop singer Britney Spears performed to a sold out crowd at the arena as a part of her Piece of Me Tour on August 11, 2018.

See also
 Bandy
 Göran Fredrik Göransson
 List of indoor arenas in Sweden

References

External links 

 

Indoor arenas in Sweden
Indoor ice hockey venues in Sweden
Ice hockey venues in Sweden
Bandy venues in Sweden
Buildings and structures in Gävleborg County
Sandviken Municipality
Sandvikens AIK
Sports venues completed in 2009
2009 establishments in Sweden